Thomas Robb (born 1899) was a Scottish professional footballer who played as a half back.

Career
Robb began his career with Kirkintilloch Harp, and joined Bradford City in December 1919. He made 11 league and 1 FA Cup appearances for the club, before moving to Bathgate in August 1921. He later played for Hamilton Academical and New York Giants.

Sources

References

1899 births
Year of death missing
Scottish footballers
Association football midfielders
Bradford City A.F.C. players
Bathgate F.C. players
Hamilton Academical F.C. players
New York Giants (soccer) players
English Football League players